NATAL - Israel Trauma and Resiliency Center (established: 1998, Tel Aviv) is a non-profit organization founded by Yossi Hadar and Judith Yovel Recanati. NATAL specializes in the field of war-and-terror-related trauma, PTSD and resiliency-building among civil society. NATAL was the first center in Israel to standardize and create protocols for coping with trauma and resilience-building in a social general society context.

References

External links 
 NATAL website

Medical and health organizations based in Israel